Yahiya Doumbia was the defending champion but lost in the first round to Jakob Hlasek.

John McEnroe won in the final 6–3, 7–6 against Hlasek.

Seeds

  Jakob Hlasek (final)
  John McEnroe (champion)
  Henri Leconte (quarterfinals)
  Jonas Svensson (semifinals)
  Anders Järryd (semifinals)
  Magnus Gustafsson (quarterfinals)
  Guy Forget (second round)
  Patrik Kühnen (quarterfinals)

Draw

Finals

Top half

Bottom half

External links
 1989 Grand Prix de Tennis de Lyon Draw

1989 Grand Prix (tennis)